Gloriana; Or, The Court of Augustus Caesar is 1676 tragedy by the English writer Nathaniel Lee. It was first performed by the King's Company at the Theatre Royal, Drury Lane in London.

The original cast included Michael Mohun as Augustus Caesar, Charles Hart as Caesario, Edward Kynaston as Marcellus, Edward Lydall as Tiberius, William Cartwright as Agrippa, Philip Griffin as Mecaenas, Thomas Clark as  Ovid, Martin Powell as  Leander, Rebecca Marshall as Gloriana, Elizabeth James as Julia and Mary Corbett as Narcissa. The published play was dedicated to the Duchess of Portsmouth, mistress of Charles II.

The play is set in the Roman Empire during the reign of the first Roman Emperor Augustus. Amongst other things it portrays the Emperor's banishment of the poet Ovid from Rome.

References

Bibliography
 Hopkins, David, Martindale, Charles. The Oxford History of Classical Reception in English Literature: The Oxford History of Classical Reception in English Literature: Volume 3 (1660-1790). OUP Oxford, 2012.
 Van Lennep, W. The London Stage, 1660-1800: Volume One, 1660-1700. Southern Illinois University Press, 1960.

1676 plays
West End plays
Tragedy plays
Plays set in the 1st century
Plays by Nathaniel Lee
Plays set in ancient Rome
Cultural depictions of Ovid
Fictional depictions of Augustus in literature